Roberto Ernesto Maroni (15 March 1955 – 22 November 2022) was an Italian politician from Varese and a past President of Lombardy. He was the leader of the Northern League, a party seeking autonomy or independence for Northern Italy or Padania. From 1992 to 2013 he was a Member of the Chamber of Deputies of the Italian Republic, always elected in Lombard constituencies. He served as Deputy Prime Minister of the Italian Republic in the Berlusconi I executive, from 1994 to 1995. He was Interior Minister of the Italian Republic from 1994 to 1995, and from 2008 to 2011. He was Labour Minister of the Italian Republic from 2001 to 2006.

Career

Early political career
In 1979, Maroni received a law degree with a dissertation in Civil Law, from the University of Milan. He became a lawyer after spending two years working as a Legal Affairs Manager for various companies.

Secretary of Varese and Minister of Interior

In 1990, he was elected Province Secretary of the Northern League in Varese. He also became a town councilor in Varese that year. Two years later, he was elected Chairman of the Northern League Parliamentary Group. He also entered the party's Federal Council and campaigned heavily for the Northern League prior to Prime Minister Silvio Berlusconi's first Cabinet.

He also served as Minister of the Interior during the first Berlusconi cabinet, from 1994 to 1995. He also served as Minister of Labour and Welfare from 2001 to May 2006 in Berlusconi's second and third cabinets.

In April 2006, after Berlusconi narrowly lost his re-election bid to Romano Prodi, Maroni alleged problems with the election comparable to those in Florida during the 2000 Presidential election. "The level pegging is very similar to what happened in Florida. With one vote more or one vote less, you lose or you win," he said.

After the 2008 electoral victory of the centre-right coalition in Italy, Maroni assumed the office of Minister of the Interior in the Berlusconi IV Cabinet.

Secretary of Lega Nord and President of Lombardy (2013–2018)
Following the forced retirement of Umberto Bossi due to his alleged involvement in a scandal, Maroni was elected Political Secretary of the Northern League at its Congress in Assago (on 30 June and 1 July 2012).
After the election on 24 February 2013, he became the ninth President of Lombardy.

Passion for music
In September 2006, Maroni told Vanity Fair that he downloads music illegally and thinks music should be "free and accessible to all". He added that authors should still be able to stop their work from being widely distributed on the Internet. Maroni said his confession was intended to spark a discussion in Parliament about changing Italy's copyright laws, which are among the strictest in Europe.

Basic income
On 12 May 2015, Maroni announced that his intention to introduce a basic income, as a pilot project, "to ensure all families in the region have enough money to be able to pay for basic necessities". He also said that the plan was to use 220 million euros from the European Social Fund (ESF) for the initiative.

Terrorism
Shortly after the 2016 Normandy church attack, Maroni called on the Pope to "immediately proclaim" Jacques Hamel "St Jacques."

Electoral history

First-past-the-post elections

References

1955 births
2022 deaths
Presidents of Lombardy
Italian politicians convicted of crimes
Italian Ministers of the Interior
Politicians from Varese
Lega Nord politicians
University of Milan alumni
20th-century Italian lawyers
21st-century Italian lawyers
Italian Roman Catholics
Italian Ministers of Labour
Deputy Prime Ministers of Italy
Deputies of Legislature XI of Italy
Deputies of Legislature XII of Italy
Deputies of Legislature XIII of Italy
Deputies of Legislature XIV of Italy
Deputies of Legislature XV of Italy
Deputies of Legislature XVI of Italy